Adolf Wüllner (13 June 1835, in Düsseldorf – 6 October 1908, in Aachen) was a German physicist.

He studied physics at the universities of Bonn, Munich and Berlin, qualifying as a lecturer at the University of Marburg in 1858. In 1862 he became director of the vocational school in Aachen, and three years later taught classes in physics at the Poppelsdorf agricultural academy. In 1867 he was named an associate professor at the University of Bonn, and from 1869 onward, was a professor of physics at the Technical University of Aachen. In 1883–86 he served as academic rector.

He is remembered for his work on the specific heat of liquids and gases, vapor tension, refractive indexes and emission spectra.

Published works 
He was the author of a successful textbook on experimental physics that was published over several editions: 
 Lehrbuch der Experimentalphysik (2 volumes 1862–65; 5th edition, 4 volumes 1907):
 Vol. 1: Allgemeine Physik und Akustik – General physics and acoustics.
 Vol. 2: Die Lehre von der Wärme – On heat.
 Vol. 3: Die Lehre vom Magnetismus und von der Elektricität – On magnetism and electricity.
 Vol, 4: Die Lehre von der Strahlung – On radiation.
Other noted works of his include:
 Ueber den Einfluss des Procentgehaltes auf die Spannkraft der Dämpfe aus wässerigen Salzlösungen (inaugural dissertation, 1856).
 Die Absorption des Lichtes in isotropen Mitteln, 1862 – Absorption of light in isotropic agents.
 Einleitung in die Dioptrik des Auges, 1866 – Introduction to the dioptrics of the eye.
 Die Entwicklung der Grundanschauungen in der Physik im Laufe unseres Jahrhunderts, 1887 – The development of the fundamental principles in physics during the course of our century.
He was also the author of many scientific papers in the journal Annalen der Physik und Chemie.

References 

1835 births
1908 deaths
Scientists from Düsseldorf
Academic staff of the University of Bonn
Academic staff of RWTH Aachen University
19th-century German physicists
University of Bonn alumni
Scientists from North Rhine-Westphalia